AC-4 or AC4 may refer to:

Music 
 AC4 (band), a Swedish hardcore punk band, or their eponymous album

Vehicles

Aircraft 
 Light Wing AC4, an aircraft
 Aviastroitel AC-4 Russia, glider
 Comte AC-4, a two-seat Swiss monoplane

Ships 
 USS Cyclops (AC-4), a US Navy collier ship

Trains 
 Southern Pacific class AC-4, a class of steam locomotive

Tanks
AC4 tank a World War Two Australian cruiser tank.

Technology
 AC-4, an IEC Utilization Category
 Dolby AC-4, Dolby Digital audio codec

Videogames
 Ace Combat 04: Shattered Skies, a 2001 video game
 Armored Core 4, a 2006 video game
 Assassin's Creed IV: Black Flag, a 2013 video game

See also

 
 
 AC (disambiguation)